Elachyophtalma quadrimaculata is a moth in the Bombycidae family. It was described by van Eecke in 1924. It is found in New Guinea.

References
Citations

Sources
Natural History Museum Lepidoptera generic names catalog

Bombycidae
Moths described in 1924